Alexander Efimovich Izmaylov (Алекса′ндр Ефи′мович Изма′йлов, 25 April 1779, Vladimir Governorate, Russian Empire, — 28 January 1831, Saint Petersburg, Russian Empire) was a Russian fabulist, poet, novelist, publisher (Tsvetnik, Blagonamerenny magazines), pedagogue and one-time state official (a Tver and Arkhangelsk Governorates' vice-governor). Lauded for his satirical fables (by, among others, Vissarion Belinsky), Alexander Izmaylov is considered to be the last major literary figure of Russian Enlightenment.

References 

Russian male poets
Russian fabulists
Russian editors
People from Vladimir, Russia
1779 births
1831 deaths
Burials at Tikhvin Cemetery